Acrobasis ferruginella is a species of snout moth in the genus Acrobasis. It was described by Alfred Ernest Wileman in 1911. It is found in China.

References

Moths described in 1911
Acrobasis
Moths of Asia